The Meads of Asphodel are an English black metal band with pronounced medieval, Arab, punk, and progressive metal influences from Hertfordshire, England.

History
The band was formed in mid-1998 by Metatron and Jaldaboath. The stated aim being to "create heavy guitar-based original Black Metal with Medieval/Eastern influences and a lyrical concept derived from Christ's mortality, Biblical Apocrypha, Fallen Angels and Death." Their demo releases The Bemoaning of Metatron and Metatron and the Red Gleaming Serpent gained them a good deal of critical attention in the underground metal press, even receiving mentions from such mainstream sources as Kerrang! magazine, and they soon signed to Supernal Music after the release of their widely acclaimed final demo The Watchers of Catal Huyuk. Their albums, particularly 2001's The Excommunication of Christ explore conceptual themes based around an anti-Christian interpretation of the Bible and Apocrypha. Despite a fluctuating line-up, the band continues to release well-received music.

One of the band's most consistent features is their use of guest musicians. Over the years they have had a large roster of guests including members of Hawkwind,  Sigh, Amebix, Mael Mordha, Taake, and an actual Rabbi.

Members
Current members
Metatron – Vocals (1998–present)
J.D. Tait – Guitars, keyboards, vocals (2002–present)
André Kjelbergvik Thung – Drums (2012–present)

Former members
Jaldaboath – Guitars, music programming, vocals, bass, keyboards (1998–2002)
Urakbaramel – Drums (2002–2012)
Max Rael (History of Guns) – Keyboards, programming (2001–2007)
Paul Carter – Keyboards (2003)
Deorth – Bass (2003)
Pope Richard Alan Weeks – Bass (2015–2018)

Session musicians and guests
Alan Davey – Bass (2002–2014)
Mirai – Keyboards
Huw Lloyd-Langton – Lead guitar (2000–2007)
The Mad Mullah – drums (2002)

Discography

Studio albums
 The Excommunication of Christ (Supernal, 2001)
 Exhuming the Grave of Yeshua (Supernal, 2003)
 Damascus Steel (Supernal, 2005)
 The Murder of Jesus the Jew (Candlelight Records, 2010)
 Sonderkommando (Candlelight Records, 2013)
 Running Out of Time Doing Nothing (Godreah Records, 2019)

EPs and splits
 Freezing Moon/Jihad split with Mayhem (Supernal, 2002)
 In the Name of God, Welcome to Planet Genocide EP (Firestorm, 2006)
 Life is Shit EP (Firestorm, 2007)
 English Black Punk Metal/The Bones of This Land are Not Speechless split with Old Corpse Road (Godreah, 2010)
 Taste the Divine Wrath split with Tjolgtjar (Eternal Death, 2015)
 Imperial East-West Onslaught split with Rerthro (2018)
 The Voiceless Dust of Ages EP (2018)

Demos
 The Bemoaning of Metatron (demo, 1998)
 Metatron and the Gleaming Red Serpent (demo, 1999)
 The Watchers of Catal Huyuk (demo, 1999)

Live
 The Mill Hill Sessions (Godreah, 2004)

Compilations
 Britannia Infernus: A History of British Occult and Black (Godreah, 2002)
 Daze of the Underground: A Tribute to Hawkwind (Godreah, 2003)
 The Early Years (compilation of unreleased material from 1998–2002) (Godreah, 2009)
 Swine of Hades (Godreah, 2011)
 Voices from Valhalla: A Tribute to Bathory (Godreah, 2012)
 The Meads of Asphodel boxed Set (Fallen-Angels Productions, 2013)
 The Middle Ages (Sixsixsix Music, 2014)
 Split Promo with The Wolves of Avalon (Sixsixsix Music, 2014)
 We Worship Desaster: A Tribute to Desaster (Grom records, 2014)
 Desolate Hymns for a Fallen God (Covers Album) (Azermedoth Records, 2015)
 Tales From Bedlam (Valgriind, 2015)

Singles
 "All Things Bright & Shit" – Terrorizer Xmas Song (Terrorizer, 2006)
 "The Song of a Hundred Roars" – Terrorizer Magazine Xmas Song (Terrorizer, 2009)

References

External links
Official Homepage
 The Meads of Asphodel, Encyclopaedia Metallum 
Supernal Music Page
Godreah Records

English black metal musical groups
Musical groups established in 1998
Musical quartets